Edward Compton may refer to:

Edward Compton (actor) (1854–1918), English actor and theatre manager
Edward Theodore Compton (1849–1921), English-born German artist
Edward Harrison Compton (1881–1960), German painter
Edward Compton (cricketer) (1872–1940), English cricketer

See also
Edward Crompton, baseball player
Compton (surname)